Gelechia albomaculata is a moth of the family Gelechiidae. It is found in the Russian Far East (Primorye) and China (Jilin).

References

Moths described in 1986
Gelechia